"Change" is a song by British singer-songwriter and actress Lisa Stansfield from her second album, Real Love (1991). The song was written by Stansfield, Ian Devaney and Andy Morris, and produced by Devaney and Morris. It was released as the lead single on 7 October 1991. "Change" was remixed by Frankie Knuckles and Driza Bone.

"Change" became a hit, reaching top 10 in several European countries and Canada. In the United States, it peaked at number 27 on the Billboard Hot 100, number one on the Hot Dance Club Songs (for two weeks), number 12 on the Hot R&B/Hip-Hop Songs and number 13 on the Adult Contemporary Singles. Two music videos for the song were released: the European version directed by Steve Lowe and the US version directed by Stefan Würnitzer.

In 2003, "Change" was included on Biography: The Greatest Hits. In 2014, the remixes of "Change" were included on the deluxe 2CD + DVD re-release of Real Love and on People Hold On ... The Remix Anthology (also on The Collection 1989–2003).

Chart performance
"Change" became a major hit in Europe, and remains one of Stansfield's most successful songs. It was a top-10 hit in Belgium (6), Italy (2), the Netherlands (7), Spain (6) and the UK (10). In the latter, it peaked at number 10 on the UK Singles Chart, on 20 October 1991. The single also was a top-20 hit in Germany (13), Ireland (17), Sweden (13) and Switzerland (12). On the Eurochart Hot 100, "Change" peaked at number 11 in November 1993, while on the European Dance Radio Chart, it reached number one same month. 

Outside Europe, the single was successful also in Canada, where it peaked at number 10, and in the US, where it peaked at number-one for two weeks on the Billboard Dance Club Songs chart, number 27 on the Billboard Hot 100, number 12 on the Billboard Hot R&B/Hip-Hop Songs and number 13 on the Billboard Adult Contemporary Singles. In Australia and New Zealand, the song peaked at number 21 and 20, respectively.

Critical reception
The song received favorable reviews from many music critics. David Taylor-Wilson from Bay Area Reporter wrote that Stansfield is "sounding like Donna Summer". Larry Flick from Billboard complimented it as "a gorgeous down-tempo disco trip", adding that with "a subtle slice of Philly-styled soul, Stansfield's lovely alto is caressed by soft strings and a warm bassline. Factor in a memorable chorus and you have the makings of a multiformat smash." A reviewer from Boston Herald noted that the "husky-voiced" singer "purrs" through the song. The Columbus Dispatch remarked that before Stansfield even gets around to singing on "Change", "she breathes - deeply - into her microphone to establish mood. Nearly every line in the song, in fact, is preceded by a sensuous expulsion of breath." Dave Sholin from the Gavin Report commented that "blending elements of jazz, pop and dance is an art Lisa and partners Ian Devaney and Andy Morris perfected on their debut album, and now they take us to level two. If this lead-off single is any indication, her soon-to-be-released album Real Love should cause an awful lot of excitement when it hits the street." 

Scott Sterling from The Michigan Daily complimented the song as a "smooth, driving groove with luscious strings and mellow horns that sounds like a '90s Love Unlimited Orchestra." Daniel S. Housman from Miscellany News felt it "seems addressed to a friend in need." Pan-European magazine Music & Media found that on her first single in two years, Stansfield is updating the '70s "Philly" soul sound, "tastefully adding a fashionable dance beat to it." James Hamilton from Music Weeks RM Dance Update named it "her best in ages". The Newcastle Evening Chronicle noted that it "marks the start of a new and exciting era in her career." Parry Gettelman from Orlando Sentinel felt it's the "best track" of the album, saying that "Its catchy melody floats along on a sea of strings and burbling synth and horn riffs." The Sun-Sentinels reviewer found that "Change" "deals with unconditional love. The woman is telling the man that she loves him and always will despite all he's put her through. (Sound familiar, ladies?) This song has a funky beat that really gets you moving." Caroline Sullivan from  Smash Hits described Stansfield's voice as "glass-shattering".
    
Music video
The European music video for "Change", directed by Steve Lowe begins with a close-up of Stansfield's face against a white background as she sings the chorus. Some scenes show her walking along the feet of some giant statues. Other scenes show her standing on a balcony on top of a building at night with thunderstorms over the rooftops. She also sometimes sits on a beach. All these scenes are mixed with close-ups of the singer's face against the light background. The video was later published on Stansfield's official YouTube channel in March 2012, and had generated more than 8.3 million views as of February 2023.

Track listings

 European and US 7-inch single; Japanese CD single"Change" (Single Mix) – 4:18
"A Little More Love" – 4:28

 European CD single"Change" (Single Mix) – 4:18
"Change" (Driza Bone Mix) – 6:11
"A Little More Love" – 4:28

 UK CD single"Change" (Single Mix) – 4:18
"Change" (Driza Bone Mix) – 6:11
"Change" (Knuckles Mix) – 6:29

 US CD single"Change" (Single Mix) – 4:18
"Change" (Classic Radio Mix Edit) – 3:55
"Change" (Ultimate Club Mix) – 7:54
"It's Got to Be Real" – 5:17

 European 12-inch single"Change" (Driza Bone Mix) – 6:11
"A Little More Love" – 4:28
"Change" (Knuckles Mix) – 6:29

 UK 12-inch single"Change" (Driza Bone Mix) – 6:11
"Change" (Bone-Idol Mix) – 5:57
"Change" (Knuckles Mix) – 6:29

 US 12-inch single"Change" (Ultimate Club Mix) – 7:54
"Change" (Misty Dub Mix) – 7:31
"Change" (Driza Bone Dub Mix) – 6:08
"Change" (Single Mix) – 4:18

 2006 US digital Dance Vault Mixes'
"Change" (Ultimate Club Mix) – 7:54
"Change" (Misty Dub Mix) – 7:31
"Change" (Driza Bone Mix) – 6:11
"Change" (Single Mix) – 4:18
"Change" (Knuckles Mix) – 6:29
"Change" (Bone-Idol Mix) – 5:57

Charts

Weekly charts

Year-end charts

See also
List of number-one dance singles of 1991 (U.S.)

References

Lisa Stansfield songs
1991 singles
1991 songs
Arista Records singles
Songs written by Andy Morris (musician)
Songs written by Ian Devaney
Songs written by Lisa Stansfield